Biquefarre is a 1983 French docufiction film, written and directed by Georges Rouquier, about the uncertain future facing a small farm in Aveyron. The film revisits characters first documented by Rouquier in his 1947 film .

The film entered the competition at the 40th Venice International Film Festival, where it received the Special Jury Prize.

Cast 
 Henri Rouquier : Henri
 Maria Rouquier : Maria
 Roger Malet : Raoul
 Marius Benaben : Lucien
 André Benaben : Marcel

References

External links

More on Georges Rouquier, Farrebique and Biquefarre

1983 films
Docufiction films
Films directed by Georges Rouquier
Venice Grand Jury Prize winners
Aveyron
Agriculture in France
French sequel films
1980s French films